Throughout Odesa, Ukraine's history, the office of Novorossiya Governor and Odesa mayor was closely aligned and often was held by the same leader.

List of Mayors

See also
 Timeline of Odesa

References

 
Odesa